The 2002–03 Boston Bruins season was the team's 79th season of operation.

Offseason
Joe Thornton was named the 17th captain in team history on October 8, 2002.

Regular season
Head coach Robbie Ftorek was fired on March 19 and general manager Mike O'Connell assumed coaching duties on an interim basis through the end of the season.

Final standings

Playoffs

Schedule and results

Regular season

|- align="center" bgcolor="#FFBBBB"
|1||L||October 11, 2002||1–5 || align="left"| @ Minnesota Wild (2002–03) ||0–1–0–0 || 
|- align="center" bgcolor="#CCFFCC"
|2||W||October 14, 2002||2–1 || align="left"| @ Colorado Avalanche (2002–03) ||1–1–0–0 || 
|- align="center" bgcolor="#CCFFCC" 
|3||W||October 16, 2002||6–3 || align="left"| @ Vancouver Canucks (2002–03) ||2–1–0–0 || 
|- align="center" 
|4||T||October 17, 2002||3–3 OT|| align="left"| @ Calgary Flames (2002–03) ||2–1–1–0 || 
|- align="center" bgcolor="#CCFFCC" 
|5||W||October 19, 2002||4–3 || align="left"| @ Edmonton Oilers (2002–03) ||3–1–1–0 || 
|- align="center" bgcolor="#CCFFCC" 
|6||W||October 21, 2002||4–1 || align="left"| @ Toronto Maple Leafs (2002–03) ||4–1–1–0 || 
|- align="center" 
|7||T||October 24, 2002||2–2 OT|| align="left"|  Ottawa Senators (2002–03) ||4–1–2–0 || 
|- align="center" bgcolor="#CCFFCC" 
|8||W||October 26, 2002||4–3 || align="left"|  Atlanta Thrashers (2002–03) ||5–1–2–0 || 
|- align="center" bgcolor="#CCFFCC" 
|9||W||October 30, 2002||7–2 || align="left"| @ Washington Capitals (2002–03) ||6–1–2–0 || 
|- align="center" bgcolor="#FFBBBB"
|10||L||October 31, 2002||1–4 || align="left"|  Mighty Ducks of Anaheim (2002–03) ||6–2–2–0 || 
|-

|- align="center" bgcolor="#CCFFCC" 
|11||W||November 2, 2002||3–2 || align="left"|  New York Rangers (2002–03) ||7–2–2–0 || 
|- align="center" bgcolor="#FF6F6F"
|12||OTL||November 7, 2002||1–2 OT|| align="left"| @ Detroit Red Wings (2002–03) ||7–2–2–1 || 
|- align="center" bgcolor="#CCFFCC" 
|13||W||November 9, 2002||7–1 || align="left"|  Ottawa Senators (2002–03) ||8–2–2–1 || 
|- align="center" bgcolor="#CCFFCC" 
|14||W||November 11, 2002||6–1 || align="left"|  Edmonton Oilers (2002–03) ||9–2–2–1 || 
|- align="center" bgcolor="#CCFFCC" 
|15||W||November 12, 2002||4–3 || align="left"| @ Buffalo Sabres (2002–03) ||10–2–2–1 || 
|- align="center" bgcolor="#CCFFCC" 
|16||W||November 14, 2002||4–1 || align="left"|  New York Islanders (2002–03) ||11–2–2–1 || 
|- align="center" 
|17||T||November 16, 2002||2–2 OT|| align="left"| @ Philadelphia Flyers (2002–03) ||11–2–3–1 || 
|- align="center" bgcolor="#FFBBBB"
|18||L||November 19, 2002||0–2 || align="left"| @ Toronto Maple Leafs (2002–03) ||11–3–3–1 || 
|- align="center" bgcolor="#CCFFCC" 
|19||W||November 21, 2002||3–1 || align="left"|  Carolina Hurricanes (2002–03) ||12–3–3–1 || 
|- align="center" bgcolor="#CCFFCC" 
|20||W||November 23, 2002||4–1 || align="left"|  Buffalo Sabres (2002–03) ||13–3–3–1 || 
|- align="center" bgcolor="#CCFFCC" 
|21||W||November 26, 2002||7–2 || align="left"|  Calgary Flames (2002–03) ||14–3–3–1 || 
|- align="center" bgcolor="#CCFFCC" 
|22||W||November 29, 2002||4–2 || align="left"|  Montreal Canadiens (2002–03) ||15–3–3–1 || 
|- align="center" bgcolor="#CCFFCC" 
|23||W||November 30, 2002||3–2 || align="left"| @ Pittsburgh Penguins (2002–03) ||16–3–3–1 || 
|-

|- align="center" bgcolor="#FFBBBB"
|24||L||December 3, 2002||0–4 || align="left"|  St. Louis Blues (2002–03) ||16–4–3–1 || 
|- align="center" bgcolor="#CCFFCC" 
|25||W||December 5, 2002||4–3 OT|| align="left"|  Atlanta Thrashers (2002–03) ||17–4–3–1 || 
|- align="center" bgcolor="#CCFFCC" 
|26||W||December 7, 2002||3–2 OT|| align="left"|  Tampa Bay Lightning (2002–03) ||18–4–3–1 || 
|- align="center" bgcolor="#CCFFCC" 
|27||W||December 8, 2002||4–1 || align="left"| @ New York Rangers (2002–03) ||19–4–3–1 || 
|- align="center" bgcolor="#FFBBBB"
|28||L||December 10, 2002||2–4 || align="left"|  Montreal Canadiens (2002–03) ||19–5–3–1 || 
|- align="center" bgcolor="#FFBBBB"
|29||L||December 12, 2002||2–5 || align="left"|  Ottawa Senators (2002–03) ||19–6–3–1 || 
|- align="center" bgcolor="#FFBBBB"
|30||L||December 14, 2002||2–4 || align="left"| @ Montreal Canadiens (2002–03) ||19–7–3–1 || 
|- align="center" bgcolor="#FFBBBB"
|31||L||December 18, 2002||2–4 || align="left"| @ Buffalo Sabres (2002–03) ||19–8–3–1 || 
|- align="center" bgcolor="#FFBBBB"
|32||L||December 19, 2002||3–5 || align="left"| @ Washington Capitals (2002–03) ||19–9–3–1 || 
|- align="center" 
|33||T||December 21, 2002||3–3 OT|| align="left"|  Florida Panthers (2002–03) ||19–9–4–1 || 
|- align="center" bgcolor="#CCFFCC" 
|34||W||December 23, 2002||5–2 || align="left"|  San Jose Sharks (2002–03) ||20–9–4–1 || 
|- align="center" bgcolor="#FFBBBB"
|35||L||December 27, 2002||2–5 || align="left"| @ Tampa Bay Lightning (2002–03) ||20–10–4–1 || 
|- align="center" bgcolor="#CCFFCC" 
|36||W||December 28, 2002||1–0 || align="left"| @ Atlanta Thrashers (2002–03) ||21–10–4–1 || 
|- align="center" bgcolor="#FFBBBB"
|37||L||December 30, 2002||0–1 || align="left"|  New Jersey Devils (2002–03) ||21–11–4–1 || 
|-

|- align="center" bgcolor="#FFBBBB"
|38||L||January 3, 2003||4–8 || align="left"| @ New York Islanders (2002–03) ||21–12–4–1 || 
|- align="center" bgcolor="#FFBBBB"
|39||L||January 4, 2003||2–4 || align="left"|  Carolina Hurricanes (2002–03) ||21–13–4–1 || 
|- align="center" bgcolor="#FFBBBB"
|40||L||January 7, 2003||2–5 || align="left"| @ Toronto Maple Leafs (2002–03) ||21–14–4–1 || 
|- align="center" bgcolor="#FFBBBB"
|41||L||January 10, 2003||2–4 || align="left"| @ Buffalo Sabres (2002–03) ||21–15–4–1 || 
|- align="center" bgcolor="#CCFFCC" 
|42||W||January 11, 2003||6–2 || align="left"|  Toronto Maple Leafs (2002–03) ||22–15–4–1 || 
|- align="center" bgcolor="#FFBBBB"
|43||L||January 13, 2003||1–2 || align="left"|  Pittsburgh Penguins (2002–03) ||22–16–4–1 || 
|- align="center" bgcolor="#FFBBBB"
|44||L||January 15, 2003||0–3 || align="left"| @ Florida Panthers (2002–03) ||22–17–4–1 || 
|- align="center" bgcolor="#FFBBBB"
|45||L||January 17, 2003||1–3 || align="left"| @ Atlanta Thrashers (2002–03) ||22–18–4–1 || 
|- align="center" bgcolor="#CCFFCC" 
|46||W||January 18, 2003||7–2 || align="left"|  Columbus Blue Jackets (2002–03) ||23–18–4–1 || 
|- align="center" 
|47||T||January 20, 2003||3–3 OT|| align="left"|  Washington Capitals (2002–03) ||23–18–5–1 || 
|- align="center" bgcolor="#CCFFCC" 
|48||W||January 23, 2003||4–1 || align="left"| @ Pittsburgh Penguins (2002–03) ||24–18–5–1 || 
|- align="center" bgcolor="#CCFFCC" 
|49||W||January 25, 2003||1–0 OT|| align="left"|  Philadelphia Flyers (2002–03) ||25–18–5–1 || 
|- align="center" bgcolor="#CCFFCC" 
|50||W||January 28, 2003||2–1 || align="left"|  Nashville Predators (2002–03) ||26–18–5–1 || 
|- align="center" bgcolor="#FFBBBB"
|51||L||January 30, 2003||1–3 || align="left"|  Chicago Blackhawks (2002–03) ||26–19–5–1 || 
|-

|- align="center" bgcolor="#FF6F6F"
|52||OTL||February 4, 2003||2–3 OT|| align="left"|  Colorado Avalanche (2002–03) ||26–19–5–2 || 
|- align="center" bgcolor="#CCFFCC" 
|53||W||February 6, 2003||6–3 || align="left"|  Montreal Canadiens (2002–03) ||27–19–5–2 || 
|- align="center" bgcolor="#FFBBBB"
|54||L||February 8, 2003||2–5 || align="left"|  Pittsburgh Penguins (2002–03) ||27–20–5–2 || 
|- align="center" bgcolor="#FFBBBB"
|55||L||February 11, 2003||1–3 || align="left"| @ Montreal Canadiens (2002–03) ||27–21–5–2 || 
|- align="center" bgcolor="#CCFFCC" 
|56||W||February 14, 2003||6–5 OT|| align="left"| @ Florida Panthers (2002–03) ||28–21–5–2 || 
|- align="center" bgcolor="#FFBBBB"
|57||L||February 15, 2003||2–5 || align="left"| @ Tampa Bay Lightning (2002–03) ||28–22–5–2 || 
|- align="center" bgcolor="#FFBBBB"
|58||L||February 17, 2003||1–5 || align="left"| @ Nashville Predators (2002–03) ||28–23–5–2 || 
|- align="center" 
|59||T||February 19, 2003||1–1 OT|| align="left"| @ Carolina Hurricanes (2002–03) ||28–23–6–2 || 
|- align="center" bgcolor="#FFBBBB"
|60||L||February 21, 2003||2–3 || align="left"| @ New Jersey Devils (2002–03) ||28–24–6–2 || 
|- align="center" 
|61||T||February 23, 2003||4–4 OT|| align="left"| @ New York Islanders (2002–03) ||28–24–7–2 || 
|- align="center" 
|62||T||February 25, 2003||5–5 OT|| align="left"|  Dallas Stars (2002–03) ||28–24–8–2 || 
|- align="center" bgcolor="#FFBBBB"
|63||L||February 27, 2003||1–4 || align="left"| @ New York Rangers (2002–03) ||28–25–8–2 || 
|-

|- align="center" bgcolor="#FF6F6F"
|64||OTL||March 1, 2003||2–3 OT|| align="left"|  Philadelphia Flyers (2002–03) ||28–25–8–3 || 
|- align="center" bgcolor="#FFBBBB"
|65||L||March 3, 2003||4–6 || align="left"|  Vancouver Canucks (2002–03) ||28–26–8–3 || 
|- align="center" bgcolor="#CCFFCC" 
|66||W||March 4, 2003||4–2 || align="left"| @ Carolina Hurricanes (2002–03) ||29–26–8–3 || 
|- align="center" bgcolor="#CCFFCC" 
|67||W||March 6, 2003||4–1 || align="left"|  New York Islanders (2002–03) ||30–26–8–3 || 
|- align="center" bgcolor="#CCFFCC" 
|68||W||March 8, 2003||5–4 OT|| align="left"|  Washington Capitals (2002–03) ||31–26–8–3 || 
|- align="center" bgcolor="#FFBBBB"
|69||L||March 9, 2003||5–8 || align="left"| @ Chicago Blackhawks (2002–03) ||31–27–8–3 || 
|- align="center" bgcolor="#FF6F6F"
|70||OTL||March 11, 2003||3–4 OT|| align="left"| @ Ottawa Senators (2002–03) ||31–27–8–4 || 
|- align="center" bgcolor="#CCFFCC" 
|71||W||March 13, 2003||4–3 || align="left"|  New Jersey Devils (2002–03) ||32–27–8–4 || 
|- align="center" bgcolor="#CCFFCC" 
|72||W||March 15, 2003||4–1 || align="left"|  Florida Panthers (2002–03) ||33–27–8–4 || 
|- align="center" bgcolor="#FFBBBB"
|73||L||March 18, 2003||1–2 || align="left"| @ Phoenix Coyotes (2002–03) ||33–28–8–4 || 
|- align="center" bgcolor="#FFBBBB"
|74||L||March 21, 2003||2–3 || align="left"| @ San Jose Sharks (2002–03) ||33–29–8–4 || 
|- align="center" bgcolor="#CCFFCC" 
|75||W||March 22, 2003||4–3 OT|| align="left"| @ Los Angeles Kings (2002–03) ||34–29–8–4 || 
|- align="center" bgcolor="#CCFFCC" 
|76||W||March 24, 2003||3–2 || align="left"|  Toronto Maple Leafs (2002–03) ||35–29–8–4 || 
|- align="center" 
|77||T||March 27, 2003||2–2 OT|| align="left"| @ Philadelphia Flyers (2002–03) ||35–29–9–4 || 
|- align="center" bgcolor="#FFBBBB"
|78||L||March 29, 2003||1–3 || align="left"|  New York Rangers (2002–03) ||35–30–9–4 || 
|- align="center" 
|79||T||March 31, 2003||2–2 OT|| align="left"|  Tampa Bay Lightning (2002–03) ||35–30–10–4 || 
|-

|- align="center" bgcolor="#FFBBBB"
|80||L||April 1, 2003||2–3 || align="left"| @ Ottawa Senators (2002–03) ||35–31–10–4 || 
|- align="center" 
|81||T||April 3, 2003||1–1 OT|| align="left"| @ New Jersey Devils (2002–03) ||35–31–11–4 || 
|- align="center" bgcolor="#CCFFCC" 
|82||W||April 5, 2003||8–5 || align="left"|  Buffalo Sabres (2002–03) ||36–31–11–4 || 
|-

|-
| Legend:

Playoffs

|- align="center" bgcolor="#FFBBBB"
| 1 ||L|| April 9, 2003 || @ New Jersey Devils || 1–2 || Devils lead 1–0 || 
|- align="center" bgcolor="#FFBBBB"
| 2 ||L|| April 11, 2003 || @ New Jersey Devils || 2–4 || Devils lead 2–0 || 
|- align="center" bgcolor="#FFBBBB"
| 3 ||L|| April 13, 2003 || New Jersey Devils || 0–3 || Devils lead 3–0 || 
|- align="center" bgcolor="#CCFFCC"
| 4 ||W|| April 15, 2003 || New Jersey Devils || 5–1 || Devils lead 3–1 || 
|- align="center" bgcolor="#FFBBBB"
| 5 ||L|| April 17, 2003 || @ New Jersey Devils || 0–3 || Devils win 4–1 || 
|-

|-
| Legend:

Player statistics

Scoring
 Position abbreviations: C = Center; D = Defense; G = Goaltender; LW = Left Wing; RW = Right Wing
  = Joined team via a transaction (e.g., trade, waivers, signing) during the season. Stats reflect time with the Bruins only.
  = Left team via a transaction (e.g., trade, waivers, release) during the season. Stats reflect time with the Bruins only.

Goaltending
  = Joined team via a transaction (e.g., trade, waivers, signing) during the season. Stats reflect time with the Bruins only.
  = Left team via a transaction (e.g., trade, waivers, release) during the season. Stats reflect time with the Bruins only.

Awards and records

Awards

Milestones

Transactions
The Bruins were involved in the following transactions from June 14, 2002, the day after the deciding game of the 2002 Stanley Cup Finals, through June 9, 2003, the day of the deciding game of the 2003 Stanley Cup Finals.

Trades

Players acquired

Players lost

Signings

Draft picks
Boston's draft picks at the 2002 NHL Entry Draft held at the Air Canada Centre in Toronto, Ontario.

See also
2002–03 NHL season

Notes

References

Boston Bruins
Boston Bruins
Boston Bruins seasons
Boston Bruins
Boston Bruins
Bruins
Bruins